Boldogasszonyfa is a village in Baranya county, Hungary.

Location 
It is on the border of Baranya and Somogy counties, next to Szentlászló. The nearest city is Szigetvár, which is 10 km from the village.

History 
Boldogasszonyfa has been inhabited since the Stone Age. Its name is first mentioned in 1344 in a diploma. In 1746 came Slavs and Germans. The village was owned by the Igmándy family.

In 1950 the government of Hungary annexed the village from Somogy to Baranya. In 2001 the population's consistency was 2,7% German and 6% Gypsy; the others were Hungarians and others.

Monuments 
 Chateau Igmándy
 Roman Catholic Church (built up between 1830 and 1872 (classic style))
 Memorial park of the deployed Germans
 Memorial park of the world war victims
 World War victims' memory cross

External links 
 Local statistics 

Populated places in Baranya County